Ričardas Berankis won the tournament, beating Marsel İlhan 7–5, 5–7, 6–3

Seeds

Draw

Finals

Top half

Bottom half

References 
 Main draw
 Qualifying draw

President's Cup (tennis) - Men's Singles
2014 Men's Singles